Saeid Ghadami (born April 3, 1992) is an Iranian footballer midfielder who currently plays for   Damash and is a member of the Iran national under-23 football team.

Club career

Foolad
Ghadami is part of the Foolad squad in 9th Iranian Premier League. He made his debut for Foolad against Esteghlal Ahvaz on 4 April 2010 when he used as substitute.

Persepolis
He played two seasons for Foolad and moved to Persepolis in the winter of 2011. He was used as a left winger and left back. He signed a 2.5-year contract until the end of the 2013–14 season.

Club career statistics

 Assists

International

U–17
Ghadami represented Iran U–17 in the 2009 FIFA U-17 World Cup. He made an appearance during the 2009 FIFA U-17 World Cup against Netherlands U-17 while he used as a substitute.

U–20
Ghadami was invited to the Iran U–20 preliminary squad to compete 2010 AFC U-19 Championship, but was removed from the final squad by the coach, Ali Doustimehr.

Honours
Persepolis
Hazfi Cup: 2012–13 (Runner-up)

References

External links 
 Saeed Ghadami at PersianLeague.com

1992 births
Living people
Foolad FC players
Iranian footballers
Persepolis F.C. players
Damash Gilan players
Association football fullbacks
People from Yasuj